Sapmaz is a small village of Kürtün district of the Gümüşhane Province in Turkey. Its former name was Gelivar, a Greek word meaning "beautiful ring" in modern Greek.

References

Villages in Gümüşhane Province